Aït Smaïl is a town in northern Algeria, which has a Mediterranean, hot summer climate.

References

Communes of Béjaïa Province